A total solar eclipse occurred on October 2, 1959. A solar eclipse occurs when the Moon passes between Earth and the Sun, thereby totally or partly obscuring the image of the Sun for a viewer on Earth. A total solar eclipse occurs when the Moon's apparent diameter is larger than the Sun's, blocking all direct sunlight, turning day into darkness. Totality occurs in a narrow path across Earth's surface, with the partial solar eclipse visible over a surrounding region thousands of kilometres wide. Totality was visible from northeastern Massachusetts and the southern tip of New Hampshire in the United States, Canary Islands, Morocco, Spanish Sahara (today's West Sahara) including the capital city Laayoune, French Mauritania (today's Mauritania), Mali Federation (part now belonging to Mali), French Niger (today's Niger), British Nigeria (today's Nigeria), British Cameroons and French Cameroons (now belonging to Cameroon), French Chad (today's Chad) including the capital city Fort-Lamy, French Central Africa (today's Central African Republic), Sudan (part of the path of totality is now in South Sudan), Ethiopia, and the Trust Territory of Somaliland (today's Somalia).

Observations
Totality began over Boston, Massachusetts at sunrise. Viewing the eclipse was rained out, but it was reported that the brightening of the sky after the eclipse was a startling and impressive sight.  A few photographers captured the eclipse from airplanes above the clouds, and a multiple exposure was made atop the R. C. A. building in New York City.  The next total eclipse over Boston, the solar eclipse of May 1, 2079, will also be a sunrise event.

The event was also observed at the Canarian Island of Fuerteventura by a team of Dutch astronomers of the university of Utrecht and Amsterdam.

Maurice Allais, a French polymath, reported the alleged anomalous behavior of pendulums or gravimeters, later named as Allais effect. He first reported the effect after observing the solar eclipse of June 30, 1954, and reported another observation of the effect during this solar eclipse using the paraconical pendulum he invented.

Related eclipses

Solar eclipses of 1957–1960

Solar 143

Inex series

Metonic series

Tritos series

See also 
 List of solar eclipses visible from the United Kingdom 1000–2090 AD

Notes

References

1959 10 02
1959 in science
1959 10 02
October 1959 events